"Dust Cake Boy" is the first single by Babes in Toyland from their debut album, Spanking Machine. It was released on black 7" vinyl and features the final version of the song, along with an earlier version of the song "Spit to See the Shine" as a b-side, which was later released on the 1991 EP, To Mother.

Track listing

Personnel
Musicians
Kat Bjellandvocals, guitar
Michelle Leonbass
Lori Barberodrums

Technical
 Brian Paulsonmixing
 Drometteartwork design
 Brad Millerphotography

References

1989 singles
Babes in Toyland (band) songs
Songs with feminist themes
1989 songs